George Beauclerk, 3rd Duke of St Albans (25 June 1730 – 1 February 1786), styled Earl of Burford until 1751, was a British peer.

Early life 
He was the son of Charles Beauclerk, 2nd Duke of St Albans, and his wife, Lucy Werden. His paternal grandfather, Charles Beauclerk, 1st Duke of St Albans, was an illegitimate son of King Charles II of England by his mistress Nell Gwynne.

Marriage 

On 23 December 1752 at St George's, Hanover Square, in London, Beauclerk married Jane Roberts (d. 16 Dec 1778), daughter and heiress of Sir Walter Roberts, 6th Baronet of Glassenbury (1691–1745), and his wife, Elizabeth Slaughter (only daughter and heiress of William Slaughter, of Rochester, county Kent). Jane Roberts died on 16 December 1778 without issue. On Beauclerk's death in 1786, his titles passed to his second cousin George Beauclerk.

He was High Steward of Windsor in 1751, a Lord of the Bedchamber in the same year, and Lord Lieutenant of Berkshire from 1751 to 1760 and again from 1771 to 1786. He died in Brussels.

References 

1730 births
1786 deaths
103
George
Lord-Lieutenants of Berkshire
G